"Your Kisses Are Wasted on Me" was the second single from The Pipettes' debut album We Are the Pipettes. It was released on 27 March 2006 and available on CD, double 7" vinyl and digital download on Memphis Industries. The single was accompanied by another music video and garnered substantial airplay.

Track listing

CD single

"Your Kisses Are Wasted on Me"
"Dirty Mind (acoustic version)"

7" white vinyl single

"Your Kisses Are Wasted on Me"
"Your Guitars Are Wasted on Me"

7" green vinyl

"Your Kisses Are Wasted on Me"
"Judy (acoustic version)"

Chart positions

EP

Your Kisses Are Wasted on Me is an extended play which was released in June 2007 in the United States distributed under the Cherrytree Records, an imprint of Interscope Records.

Track listing

Enhanced CD
"Your Kisses Are Wasted on Me"
"I Love You"
"Really That Bad"
"Guess Who Ran Off with the Milkman?"
Video: "Your Kisses Are Wasted on Me"

References

2006 singles
2006 songs
The Pipettes songs